Patrick Webster (24 April 1924 – 24 July 1989) was a Saint Lucian clergyman and bishop for the Roman Catholic Diocese of Saint George's in Grenada. He later became archbishop of Castries, his birthplace. He was ordained in 1957. He was appointed bishop in 1969. He died in 1989.

References 

1924 births
1989 deaths
Saint Lucian Roman Catholic bishops
People from Castries Quarter
Roman Catholic bishops of Saint George's in Grenada
Roman Catholic archbishops of Castries
Saint Lucian expatriates in Grenada